The  Mexican lance-headed rattlesnake or lance-headed rattlesnake (Crotalus polystictus) is a venomous pit viper species found in central Mexico. No subspecies is currently recognized.

Description

Geographic range
The species is found on the plateau of central Mexico from southern Zacatecas and northeastern Colima east to east-central Veracruz. The type locality given is "Table Land, Mexico", although a restriction to "Tupátaro, Guanajuanto, Mexico" was proposed by H.M. Smith and Taylor (1950).

Conservation status
This species is classified as Least Concern on the IUCN Red List of Threatened Species (v3.1, 2001). Species are listed as such due to their wide distribution, presumed large population, or because they are unlikely to be declining fast enough to qualify for listing in a more threatened category. The population trend was down when assessed in 2007.

References

Further reading
 Cope, E.D. 1865. Third contribution to the HERPETOLOGY of Tropical America. Proc. Acad. Nat. Sci. Philadelphia 17: 185-198. (Caudisona polysticta, pp. 191–192.)
 Smith, H.M. and E.H. Taylor. 1950. Type localities of Mexican reptiles and amphibians. Univ. Kansas Sci. Bull. 33: 313-380.

External links

 
 Mexican Lance-headed Rattlesnake at the Saint Louis Zoo. Accessed 18 June 2008.

polystictus
Reptiles described in 1865
Taxa named by Edward Drinker Cope